Herbert is a surname, derived from the given name Herbert and may refer to:

A. P. Herbert (1890–1971), English humorist, novelist, playwright and law reform activist
Adam Herbert, former President of Indiana University and of the University of North Florida
Alfred Herbert (1866–1957), former manufacturer of machine tools
Amanda Herbert (born 1943), British cytopathologist and histopathologist
Andrew Herbert (born 1954), British computer scientist
Anne Herbert (disambiguation), multiple people
Anthony Reed Herbert, member of the British National Front
Arthur Herbert (disambiguation), multiple people
Auberon Herbert (disambiguation), multiple people
Aubrey Herbert (1880–1923), British diplomat, traveller and intelligence officer
Bob Herbert (born 1945), American journalist 
Brian Herbert (born 1947), Frank Herbert's son, author of The Dune Prequels
Caleb Claiborne Herbert (1814–1867), Confederate congressman during the American Civil War
Charles Herbert (1948–2015), American actor
Charles Herbert (Royal Navy officer) (1774–1808), captain in the Royal Navy and MP for Wilton
Christopher Herbert (born 1944), Anglican bishop
Claude-Jacques Herbert (1700–1758), French economist
Daniel Herbert (born 1974), Australian rugby union player
Don Herbert (1917–2007), television's "Mr. Wizard"
Edward Herbert (disambiguation), multiple people
Elizabeth Herbert, 3rd Baroness Herbert (c.1476–1507)
 Lady Evelyn Herbert, one of the first people in modern times to enter the tomb of Tutenkhamun
Frank Herbert (1920–1986), American science-fiction novelist, author of Dune
Frank Herbert (politician) (1931–2018), American politician and educator
Gábor Herbert (born 1979), Hungarian handball player
Gary Herbert 17th governor of Utah
George Herbert (disambiguation), multiple people
Gwyneth Herbert, British singer-songwriter
Hal Herbert (1922–2003), Canadian politician
Henry Herbert (disambiguation), multiple people
Hilary A. Herbert (1834–1919), Secretary of the Navy under US President Grover Cleveland
Jacob V. W. Herbert (1812–1899), American politician
James Herbert (1943–2013), British writer of horror fiction
James Herbert (director) (born 1938), American music video and short film director
Jason Herbert (born 1967), British pop star turned manager
Jean Herbert (1897–1980), French interpreter and orientalist
John Herbert (disambiguation), multiple people
John Herbert, character from the television series Family Guy, also called "Mr. Herbert" or "Herbert the Pervert"
Johnny Herbert, British racing driver
Joseph W. Herbert (1863–1923), British-born American actor, singer and dramatist
Justin Herbert (born 1998), American football player
Khalil Herbert (born 1998), American football player
Leon Herbert, British actor
Llewellyn Herbert, South African athlete
Máire Herbert, Irish historian 
Mary Herbert (disambiguation), multiple people
Matthew Herbert, musician and music producer
Mervyn Herbert, British diplomat and cricketer
Nick Herbert, British politician
Nick Herbert (physicist), Californian physicist, author of Elemental Mind
Patrick F. Herbert, American carpenter and politician
Paul M. Herbert, American politician
Percy Herbert (disambiguation), multiple people
Philemon T. Herbert, American politician and Confederate Army officer during American civil war
Philip Herbert, 4th Earl of Pembroke
Philip Herbert, 5th Earl of Pembroke
Pierre-Hugues Herbert, French tennis player
Ricki Herbert, New Zealand football (soccer) player
Robert Herbert (1831–1905), first Premier of Queensland
Ron Herbert, rugby league player for Warrington
Sandra Herbert (born 1942), American historian of science
Sidney Herbert, 14th Earl of Pembroke
Sidney Herbert, 1st Baron Herbert of Lea
Thomas Herbert (disambiguation), multiple people
Timothy Herbert, British orthopaedic surgeon
Tom Herbert (1888–1946), American character actor
Ulrich Herbert, German historian
Victor Herbert (1859–1924), Irish-American composer and cellist
Victor Herbert (Hematologist)
Xavier Herbert, Australian author
Wally Herbert (1934–2007), British polar explorer, writer and artist
Walter Herbert, music manager and promoter, and singer-songwriter
Walter Herbert (conductor), American conductor
William Herbert (disambiguation), multiple people
Winifred Herbert (c.1680–1749), Countess of Nithsdale
Zbigniew Herbert, Polish poet, essayist and moralist

See also 
Herbert family, an Anglo-Welsh noble family bearing this surname, prominent since the 15th century
Herbert (disambiguation)
Baron Herbert (disambiguation)
Hébert
Herbart

no:Percy Herbert
pt:Percy Herbert

English-language surnames
Surnames from given names